Luchins is a surname. Notable people with the surname include:

Abraham S. Luchins (1914–2005), American psychologist
David Luchins (born 1946), American political scientist
Edith Hirsch Luchins (1921–2002), Polish-American mathematician, wife of Abraham

See also
Luchin